Synopeas hopkinsi is a species of parasitoid wasp in the family Platygastridae.

References

Further reading

 

Parasitic wasps
Platygastridae